Joseph François Noos, Baron of the Empire (11 December 1766 in Bruges – 25 August 1826 in Calais) was an officer in the army of the French Republican and fought thought the French Revolutionary Wars and the Napoleonic Wars.

See also 
 Nobility of the First French Empire

Notes

References

Bibliography

Further reading 
 
  Source Philippe Evrard

1766 births
1826 deaths
Barons of the First French Empire